The Israeli Ceremonial Protocol does not define an order of precedence. It does define, however, the group of officials that are to attend ceremonial events (Hebrew: Segel Aleph, סגל א'). This group consists of: 

 The President of Israel (נשיא מדינת ישראל) (Isaac Herzog)
 The Prime Minister of Israel  (ראש ממשלת ישראל) (Benjamin Netanyahu)
The Alternate Prime Minister of Israel (ראש ממשלת ישראל החולפי) (vacant)
 The Speaker of the Knesset (יו"ר הכנסת) (Amir Ohana)
 The President of the Supreme Court of Israel (נשיא בית המשפט העליון) (Esther Hayut)
 The Chief Rabbis (הרבנים הראשיים לישראל) (David Lau and Yitzhak Yosef)
 Former Presidents of Israel (נשיאי המדינה בעבר) (Moshe Katsav and Reuven Rivlin)
 Ministers of the Government (Amichai Chikli, Amihai Eliyahu, Aryeh Deri, Avi Dichter, Bezalel Smotrich, Eli Cohen, Galit Distel-Atbaryan, Haim Biton, Haim Katz, Idit Silman, Israel Katz, Itamar Ben-Gvir, Meir Porush, Michael Malchieli, Miki Zohar, Miri Regev, Nir Barkat, Ofir Akunis, Ofir Sofer, Orit Strook, Ron Dermer, Shlomo Karhi, Ya'akov Margi, Yariv Levin, Yitzhak Goldknopf, Yitzhak Wasserlauf, Yoav Ben-Tzur, Yoav Kisch)
 The Leader of the Opposition (יו"ר האופוזיציה) (Yair Lapid)
 Head of the Coalition (ראש הקואליציה) (Ofir Katz)
 Justices of the Supreme Court of Israel (שופטי בית המשפט העליון) (Hanan Melcer, Neal Hendel, Uzi Vogelman, Yitzhak Amit, Noam Sohlberg, Daphne Barak-Erez, Menachem Mazuz, Anat Baron, George Karra, David Mintz, Yosef Elron, Yael Willner, Ofer Grosskopf, Alex Stein, Gila Canfy-Steinitz, Khaled Kabub, Yechiel Kasher, Ruth Ronen), President of the National Labor Court (Varda Wirth Livne)
 The Attorney General of Israel (היועץ המשפטי לממשלה) (Gali Baharav-Miara)
 The State Comptroller (מבקר המדינה) (Matanyahu Englman)
 The Governor of the Bank of Israel (נגיד בנק ישראל) (Amir Yaron)
 Chairman of the Executive of the World Zionist Organization (יו"ר הנהלת ההסתדרות הציונית העולמית) (Yaakov Hagoel)
 Chairman of the Jewish Agency for Israel (יו"ר הסוכנות היהודית לארץ ישראל) (Doron Almog)
 The Dean of the Diplomatic Corps (זקן הסגל הדיפלומטי) (Martin Mwanambale, Zambian Ambassador to Israel)
 The Chief of Staff of the Israeli Defense Forces (הרמטכ"ל) (Aviv Kochavi)
 The Police Commissioner (מפכ"ל המשטרה) (Kobi Shabtai)
 Members of the Knesset (חברי הכנסת)
 See List of members of the twenty-fifth Knesset
 Commander of the Prison Service, Commissioner of the Fire and Rescue Commission
 Former Prime Ministers, Speakers of Knesset, Chief Rabbis, Presidents of the Supreme court and widows of former Presidents (Ehud Barak, Ehud Olmert, Shevah Weiss, Dan Tichon, Avraham Burg, Dalia Itzik, Yisrael Meir Lau, Yona Metzger, Shlomo Amar, Aharon Barak, Dorit Beinisch, Asher Grunis, and Reuma Weizman)
 Heads of Diplomatic Missions
 Representatives of the minority communities in Israel – Christians, Muslims, Druze, and Circassians
Mayor of Jerusalem (Moshe Lion)

External links
 Israeli protocol

Orders of precedence
Politics of Israel